The 1872 Indiana gubernatorial election was held on October 8, 1872. Democratic nominee Thomas A. Hendricks defeated Republican nominee Thomas M. Browne with 50.12% of the vote.

General election

Candidates
Thomas A. Hendricks, Democratic, former U.S. Senator
Thomas M. Browne, Republican, former United States Attorney for the District of Indiana

Results

References

1872
Indiana
Gubernatorial